Natal(i)ya or Natalia Goncharova may refer to:

 Natalia Goncharova (1881–1962), Russian Cubo-Futurism painter
 Natalia Goncharova (diver) (born 1985), Russian diver
 Natalya Goncharova (fencer) (born 1974), Kazakhstani fencer
 Nataliya Goncharova (volleyball) (born 1989), Russian volleyball player
 Natalia Pushkina née Goncharova, wife of poet Alexander Pushkin